The beaches of Saint-Tropez, France, are generally divided in three parts:

In-town beaches 
They consist of La Glaye, La Ponche and La Fontanette. As Saint Tropez is several hundred years old, the three beaches are small or even tiny and they are located near the heart of the village.

Pampelonne beach 

Pampelonne is the kind of beach considered a Saint-Tropez beach by most people. It is a long, mostly sandy beach, located about 5 km south-east to Saint-Tropez. Only half of the beach belongs to the commune of Saint-Tropez, but famous beach clubs – strictly speaking located in Ramatuelle – often use the term Saint-Tropez beach.

Most parts of the beach have their own parking lots, toilets, showers, changing facilities, cafes, restaurants, lifeguard patrols, rentable sun-loungers and wind-surfing opportunities.

Most of the famous clubs are located on Pampelonne beach. These include:
 Bagatelle
 Club 55
 La Voile Rouge, a resort for the rich and famous (renamed Latoya, and after a ten-year legal battle, destroyed in December 2011)
 Nikki Beach
 Verde

Plage de Tahiti 
This beach was popularised in the film And God Created Woman with Brigitte Bardot. The beach is accessed by heading to the Bay of Pampelonne and walking to the northern section of Pampelonne Beach. It is accessible via an unpaved road.

Other nearby beaches 
These include other beaches, considered near, and linked to Saint-Tropez. They include:

Plage de la Bouillabaisse 
It is located beyond the port and car park and offers views across the bay to the Maures mountains.

Plage des Salins 

Plage des Salins is sometimes wrongly included as part of Pampelonne.

References

External links
Pampelonne Beach from Ramatuelle Tourist Office
Pampelonne Beach Guide
 St Tropez Beach Guide by Riviera Beaches

Saint-Tropez
Beaches of France